Broadway Tower is a folly on Broadway Hill, near the large village of Broadway, in the English county of Worcestershire, at the second-highest point of the Cotswolds (after Cleeve Hill). Broadway Tower's base is 1,024 feet (312 metres) above sea level. The tower itself stands 65 feet (20 metres) tall. While a folly, it is functional in the sense that there are rooms inside.

History
The 'Saxon' tower was the brainchild of Capability Brown and designed by James Wyatt in 1794 in the form of a castle, and built for Barbara, Countess of Coventry in 1798–1799. The tower was built on a beacon hill, where beacons were lit on special occasions. Indeed, the beacon could be seen clearly.

For some years, the tower became home to the printing press of Sir Thomas Phillipps.  By the mid-1870s, it was being rented by C J Stone and Cormell Price, the latter being headmaster of the United Services College at Westward Ho!, and a close friend and confidant of artists William Morris, Edward Burne-Jones, and Dante Gabriel Rossetti: "I am up at Crom Price's Tower among the winds and the clouds," Morris wrote in a letter to Aglaia Coronio in the summer of 1876.

Near the tower is a memorial to the crew of an A.W.38 Whitley bomber that crashed there during a training mission in June 1943.

In the late 1950s, Broadway Tower monitored nuclear fallout in England; an underground Royal Observer Corps bunker was built  from the Tower. Staffed continuously from 1961 and designated as a master post, the bunker was one of the last such Cold War bunkers constructed and, although officially stood down in 1991, the bunker is now one of the few remaining fully equipped facilities in England.

Broadway Tower Country Park
The tower is a tourist attraction and the centre of a country park with various exhibitions open to the   public at a fee, as well as a gift shop and restaurant. The place is on the Cotswold Way and can be reached by following the Cotswold Way from the A44 road at Fish Hill, or by a steep climb out of Broadway village.

References

External links
 Official site

Castles in Worcestershire
Monuments and memorials in Worcestershire
Folly towers in England
Tourist attractions in Worcestershire
Cotswolds
Towers completed in 1799
Towers in Worcestershire